Molino Nuovo is a quarter of the city of Lugano, in the Swiss canton of Ticino. It lies to the north of the city center, and is the most populous quarter of the city. In 2012, it had a population of 9,258.

References

External links 
 
 Molino Nuovo pages on City of Lugano web site (in Italian)

Villages in Ticino
Districts of Lugano